St. Augustine Catholic Church may refer to:
St. Augustine Catholic Church (Culver City, California)
St. Augustin Catholic Church (Des Moines, Iowa)
St. Augustine Catholic Church (Grayson Springs, Kentucky)
St. Augustine's Catholic Church (Austin, Nevada)
St. Augustine's Catholic Church (Minster, Ohio)
St. Augustine's Catholic Church (Napoleon, Ohio)
St. Augustine Catholic Church (Washington, D.C.)
St Augustine's Catholic Church, Salisbury, Australia.
St Augustine's Catholic Church, Melbourne CBD, Australia.

See also
St. Augustine Catholic Church and Cemetery (disambiguation)
St. Augustine's Church (disambiguation)
St Augustine's Abbey (disambiguation)
Cathedral of Saint Augustine (disambiguation)